These ships of the Allied navies of World War II were present in Tokyo Bay on Victory over Japan Day (2 September 1945) when the Japanese Instrument of Surrender was signed on board the battleship .  The only two US vessels present at both the Pearl Harbor attack and Tokyo Bay surrender were the USS West Virginia and the USS Detroit .

 Battleships 
 
 
 
 
 
  (sister ship of USS Missouri and lead ship of the class)
  (The ship on which the surrender was signed)
 
 
 

 Light aircraft carriers 
 
 
 

 Escort carriers 
 
 
 

 Heavy cruisers 
 
 
 
 
 

 Light cruisers 
 USS Detroit (CL-8)
 HMNZS Gambia (48)
 HMAS Hobart (I63)
 
 USS Oakland (CL-95)
 USS Pasadena (CL-65)
 USS San Diego (CL-53)
 
 USS Springfield (CL-66)
 USS Wilkes-Barre (CL-103)

 Destroyers 
 USS Ault (DD-698)
 HMS Barfleur (D80)
 USS Benham (DD-796)
 USS Blue (DD-744)
 USS Buchanan (DD-484)
 USS Caperton (DD-650)
 USS Charles F. Hughes (DD-428)
 USS Clarence K. Bronson (DD-668)
 USS Cogswell (DD-651)
 USS Colahan (DD-658)
 USS Cotten (DD-669)
 USS Cushing (DD-797)
 USS De Haven (DD-727)
 USS Dortch (DD-670)
 USS Frank Knox (DD-742)
 USS Gatling (DD-671)
 USS Halsey Powell (DD-686)
 USS Healy (DD-672)
 USS Hilary P. Jones (DD-427)
 USS Ingersoll (DD-652)
 USS Kalk (DD-611)
 USS Knapp (DD-653)
 USS Lansdowne (DD-486)
 USS Lardner (DD-487)
 USS Madison (DD-425)
 USS Mayo (DD-422)
 HMAS Napier (G97)
 HMAS Nizam (G38)
 USS Nicholas (DD-449)
 USS Perkins (DD-877)
 HMS Quality (G62)
 USS Robert K. Huntington (DD-781)
 USS Southerland (DD-743)
 USS Stockham (DD-683)
 HMS Tartar (F43)
 USS Taylor (DD-468)
 HMS Teazer (R23)
 HMS Tenacious (R45)
 HMS Terpsichore (R33)
 USS Twining (DD-540)
 USS Uhlmann (DD-687)
 USS Wadleigh (DD-689)
 
  
 
 
 
 
 
 
 

 Destroyer escorts 
 USS Goss (DE-444)
 USS Kendall C. Campbell (DE-443)
 USS Lyman (DE-302)
 USS Major (DE-796)
 USS Roberts (DE-749)
 USS Ulvert M. Moore (DE-442)
 USS Waterman (DE-740)
 USS Weaver (DE-741)
 USS William Seiverling (DE-441)
USS Charles Lawrence (DE-53)
 USS John L Williamson (DE-370)

 Frigates 
 
 
 

 Sloops 
 
 

 Light minelayers 
 
 

 High speed minesweepers 
 USS Ellyson (DMS-19)
 USS Fitch (DMS-25)
 USS Gherardi (DMS-30)
 USS Hambleton (DMS-20)
 USS Hopkins (DMS-13)
 USS Jeffers (DMS-27)
 USS Macomb (DMS-23)

 Submarines 
 USS Archerfish (SS-311)
 USS Cavalla (SS-244)
 USS Gato (SS-212)
 USS Haddo (SS-255)
 USS Hake (SS-256)
 USS Muskallunge (SS-262)
 USS Pilotfish (SS-386)
 USS Razorback (SS-394)
 USS Runner (SS-476)
 USS Sea Cat (SS-399)
 USS Segundo (SS-398)
 

 Submarine chasers 
 
 
 
 
  USS PCE(C)-877

 Motor gunboats 
 
 
 

 Minesweepers 
 HMAS Ballarat (J184)
 HMAS Cessnock (J175)
 HMAS Ipswich (J186)
 USS Pheasant (AM-61)
 HMAS Pirie (J189)
 USS Pochard (AM-375)
 USS Revenge (AM-110)
 USS Token (AM-126)
 USS Tumult (AM-127)

 Motor minesweepers 
Numbered ships named and reclassified in 1947

 
 
 
 
 
 
 
 
 
 
 
 

 Auxiliary minelayers 
 

 Amphibious force flagships 
 
 
 

 High speed transports 
 USS Barr (APD-39)
 USS Begor (APD 127)
 USS Burke (APD-65)
 USS Gosselin (APD-126)
 USS Hollis (APD-86)
 USS Horace A. Bass (APD-124)
 USS John Q. Roberts (APD-94)
 USS Pavlic (APD-70)
 USS Reeves (APD-52)
 USS Runels (APD-85)
 USS Sims (APD-50)
 USS Wantuck (APD-125)
 USS William J. Pattison (APD-104)

 Tank landing ships 
 
 
 
 
 
 
 
 
 

 Dock landing ships 
 
 

 Infantry landing craft 
 
 
 
 
 
 
 
 
 

 Medium landing ships  
 USS LSM-13
 USS LSM-15
 USS LSM-71
 USS LSM-101
 USS LSM-208
 USS LSM-252
 USS LSM-284
 USS LSM-290
 USS LSM-362
 USS LSM-368
 USS LSM-371
 USS LSM-419
 USS LSM-488 
 USS LSM-180 ?

 Vehicle landing ships 
 
 

 Attack transports 
 USS Bosque (APA-135)
 USS Botetourt (APA-136)
 USS Briscoe (APA-65)
 USS Cecil (APA-96)
 USS Clearfield (APA-142)
 USS Cullman (APA-78)
 USS Darke (APA-159)
 USS Dauphin (APA-97)
 USS Deuel (APA-160)
 USS Dickens (APA-161)
 USS Hansford (APA-106)
 USS Highlands (APA-119)
 USS Lavaca (APA-180)
 USS Lenawee (APA-195)
 USS Mellette (APA-156)
 USS Missoula (APA-211)
 USS Rutland (APA-192)
 USS St. Mary's (APA-126)
 USS Sherburne (APA-205)
 USS Sheridan (APA-51)
 USS Talladega (APA-208)

 Transport 
 

 Attack cargo ships 
 USS Libra (AKA-12)
 USS Medea (AKA-31)
 USS Pamina (AKA-34)
 USS Sirona (AKA-43)
 USS Skagit (AKA-105)
 USS Todd (AKA-71)
 USS Tolland (AKA-64)
 USS Whiteside (AKA-90)
 USS Yancey (AKA-93)

 Cargo ships 
 

 Civilian cargo ships (United States) 
 
 

 Stores issue ship 
 

 Repair ship 
 

 Landing craft repair ship 
 

Oilers 
 USS Chiwawa (AO-68)
 USS Mascoma (AO-83)
 USS Neches (AO-47)
 USS Niobrara (AO-72)
 USS Tamalpais (AO-96)
 USS Mattaponi (AO-41)

 Civilian oilers (British) 
 Carelia City of Dieppe Dingledale
 Fort Wrangell Wave King

 Gasoline tanker 
 

 Destroyer tender 
 

 Hospital ships 
 USS Rescue'' (AH-18)
 
 USAHS ''Marigold (U.S. Army)
 HNLMS Tjitjalengka (Dutch)

Seaplane tenders

Small seaplane tenders

Submarine tender

Submarine rescue ship

Fleet ocean tugs

Auxiliary ocean tug

Footnotes

References 
 Source: Commander in Chief, U.S. Pacific Fleet and Pacific Ocean Areas (CINCPAC/CINCPOA) A16-3/FF12 Serial 0395, 11 February 1946: "Report of Surrender and Occupation of Japan."
 U.S. Naval Historical Center - Allied Ships Present in Tokyo Bay During the Surrender Ceremony, 2 September 1945 

Japanese surrender
Allied ships